Bloxwich North railway station serves the town of Bloxwich, in the Metropolitan Borough of Walsall, West Midlands, England. 
The station, and all trains serving it, are operated by West Midlands Trains.

History
The Chase Line from Walsall to Hednesford was reopened by British Rail to passenger trains in 1989. 
Bloxwich North station opened the following year, on 2 October 1990, to serve an area of new housing on the northern edge of the town. 
Initially, the station was just opened experimentally, although it has remained in place since then. 
Before opening, the station was known as Broad Lane, and it was possible to buy tickets to or from there to supplement a West Midlands pass.

Services
Typically, Monday to Saturday daytimes, Bloxwich North is served by two trains per hour in each direction between Birmingham New Street and Rugeley Trent Valley where connections to Stafford, Stoke-on-Trent and Crewe are available, although a small number of trains (1 per day on weekdays &  Sundays) start/terminate at Hednesford. Services are usually operated by Class 350 electric trains. Journey times are typically 9 minutes to Walsall and 33 minutes to Birmingham New Street.

References

External links

Railway stations in Walsall
DfT Category F2 stations
Railway stations opened by British Rail
Railway stations in Great Britain opened in 1990
Railway stations served by West Midlands Trains